Roy Apted (born 25 April 1937) is a former Australian rules footballer who played for St Kilda in the Victorian Football League (VFL).

A Tasmanian representative at the 1958 Melbourne and 1966 Hobart Carnivals, Apted was primarily a defender but was also used as a ruck rover. He appeared in two losing Grand Finals with North Launceston before being recruited to St Kilda. Apted could never establish himself in the St Kilda team over five seasons and returned to Tasmania where he played with Launceston.

References

Holmesby, Russell and Main, Jim (2007). The Encyclopedia of AFL Footballers. 7th ed. Melbourne: Bas Publishing.

1937 births
Living people
St Kilda Football Club players
North Launceston Football Club players
Launceston Football Club players
Australian rules footballers from Tasmania
Tasmanian Football Hall of Fame inductees